The House of Luca or Lučić was a noble family from the city of Dubrovnik and the Republic of Ragusa. It belonged to the small circle of families which belonged to the Ragusan nobility.

See also 
 Dubrovnik
 Republic of Ragusa
 Dalmatia

References 

Ragusan noble families